Raffaello Gambogi (1874 in Livorno – 1943) was an Italian painter, mainly of urban landscapes and genre scenes.

Biography

In 1891 Gambogi obtained a scholarship to the Academy of Fine Arts of Florence, where he studied under Giovanni Fattori. Among his works,  L’uscita della messa was awarded the Florence Prize in 1896, All’ombra displayed at the Fine Arts Exposition adjacent to the Festa dell’Arte e dei Fiori in Florence. In 1898 Gambogi sent Cantire to the National Exposition of Fine Arts at Turin. An example of his work, La veduta sul porto di Livorno, is not a classically beautified vedute, but reminds the viewer that Livorno was a modern port city bustling with stevedores. Similarly, the painting The emigrants depicts a family at a bustling dockside (Museo Giovanni Fattori, Livorno).

His wife, Elin Danielson-Gambogi (3 September 1861 – 31 December 1919), was a prominent Finnish painter.

Works

References
 

1874 births
1943 deaths
19th-century Italian painters
19th-century Italian male artists
Italian male painters
20th-century Italian painters
Painters from Tuscany
Italian genre painters
Accademia di Belle Arti di Firenze alumni
20th-century Italian male artists